The Archdeacons in the Diocese of Southwark are senior clergy in the Church of England in South London and Surrey. They currently include: the archdeacons of Southwark, of Reigate (formerly of Kingston-on-Thames) and of Lewisham & Greenwich (formerly of Lewisham), the Archdeacon of Croydon and the archdeacons of Wandsworth and of Lambeth. Each one has responsibility over a geographical area within the diocese.

History
The Diocese of Southwark was created on 1 May 1905 from two Diocese of Rochester archdeaconries: the archdeaconry of Southwark and the archdeaconry of Kingston-on-Thames. Parts of Surrey (from the dioceses of Winchester and of London) had first been transferred to Rochester diocese on 1 August 1877, and were organised into the Southwark archdeaconry on 3 May 1878. In 1864, the Bishop of Winchester had split the rural deanery of Southwark into three: Lambeth, Southwark, and Streatham. The Kingston archdeaconry was then created by Order in Council soon after, on 22 August 1879, by splitting the archdeaconry of Southwark: the new Kingston archdeaconry consisted of the rural deaneries of Barnes, Beddington, Godstone, Kingston, Reigate, and Streatham; and the continuing Southwark one those of Battersea, Camberwell, Clapham, Kennington, Lambeth, Newington, and Southwark. Lewisham rural deanery was erected, and other deanery boundaries altered, in early 1886.

Not long after the erection of the Diocese of Southwark, the new archdeaconry of Lewisham was created, on 6 March 1906, from part of the Southwark archdeaconry (Camberwell and Dulwich deaneries) and part of the diocese not then in an archdeaconry (Greenwich, Lewisham, and Woolwich deaneries; which had previously been in the Archdeaconry of Rochester).

The archdeaconry of Wandsworth was created in 1973, the Croydon archdeaconry (er. 1930) was moved from the Diocese of Canterbury on 1 January 1985. In 1986, the archdeaconry of Reigate was created from a renaming and reorganisation of the previous archdeaconry of Kingston-on-Thames and the archdeaconry of Lambeth was created from Southwark archdeaconry. Lewisham archdeaconry was renamed the Archdeaconry of Lewisham & Greenwich in 2008.

Current composition
, the six archdeaconries of the Diocese of Southwark comprise the following 24 deaneries:
Archdeaconry of Southwark: Deaneries of Bermondsey, of Camberwell, of Dulwich, and of Southwark & Newington
Archdeaconry of Reigate: Deaneries of Tandridge, of Reigate, and of Sutton
Archdeaconry of Lewisham & Greenwich:  Deaneries of Charlton, of Deptford, of East Lewisham, of Eltham & Mottingham, of Plumstead, and of West Lewisham
Archdeaconry of Croydon: Deaneries of Croydon Addington, of Croydon Central, of Croydon North, and of Croydon South
Archdeaconry of Wandsworth: Deaneries of Battersea, of Kingston, of Richmond & Barnes, of Tooting, and of Wandsworth
Archdeaconry of Lambeth: Deaneries of Lambeth North, of Lambeth South, and of Merton

List of archdeacons

Archdeacons of Southwark
1879–1882 (res.): Samuel Cheetham
1882–19 March 1904 (d.): John Richardson
1904–1921 (res.): Samuel Taylor (also Bishop suffragan of Kingston from 1915)
On 1 May 1905, Southwark archdeaconry was moved from Rochester diocese to the newly-created Diocese of Southwark.
1922–1926 (res.): Percy Herbert, Bishop suffragan of Kingston
1927–1952 (res.): Frederick Hawkes, Bishop suffragan of Kingston
1952–1955 (res.): William Gilpin, Bishop suffragan of Kingston
1955–1966 (ret.): Havilland Sands
1967–1973 (res.): Reginald Bazire
1973–1982 (res.): Michael Whinney
1982–1985 (res.): Wilfred Wood
1985–2004 (ret.): Douglas Bartles-Smith (afterwards archdeacon emeritus)
2004–2012 (res.): Michael Ipgrave
2012–14 April 2013: Dianna Gwilliams (Acting)
14 April 201323 June 2021: Jane Steen (became Bishop of Lynn)
15 May 2022present: Jonathan Sedgwick (Acting since 13 May 2021)

Archdeacons of Kingston-on-Thames and of Reigate
1879–1904 (res.): Charles Burney
1904–1916 (res.): George Daniell
The Archdeaconry of Kingston was moved from Rochester diocese to the newly-created Diocese of Southwark on 1 May 1905.
1916–1918 (res.): William Hough
1919–1931 (res.): Robert Joynt
1931–1946 (ret.): George Marten (afterwards archdeacon emeritus)
1946–1952 (ret.): Nicol Anderson (afterwards archdeacon emeritus)
1953–28 November 1976 (d.): Percy Robb
1977–1988 (ret.): Bernard Jacob (afterwards archdeacon emeritus)
In 1986, the archdeaconry was renamed to Reigate.
1988–1995 (ret.): Peter Coombs (afterwards archdeacon emeritus)
1996–2000 (ret.): Martin Baddeley
2001 – 23 February 2016 (ret.): Danny Kajumba (afterwards archdeacon emeritus)
aft. April – bef. July 2015 (Acting): Andrew Cunnington
autumn–winter 2015 (Acting): John Kronenberg
winter 2015/2016 – 20 October 2016 (Acting): Jonathan Clark, Bishop of Croydon
30 October 2016 – present: Moira Astin

Archdeacons of Lewisham and of Lewisham & Greenwich
1906–March 1919 (d.): Charles Escreet
1919–1932 (ret.): William Hough, Bishop suffragan of Woolwich
1932–19 July 1936 (d.): Arthur Preston, Bishop suffragan of Woolwich
1936–1947 (res.): Leslie Lang, Bishop suffragan of Woolwich
1947–1955 (res.): Robert Stannard, Bishop suffragan of Woolwich
1955–1960 (res.): Laurie Brown
1960–1972 (ret.): William Hayman
1972–1985 (ret.): Ivor Davies (afterwards archdeacon emeritus)
1985–1989 (ret.): Clifford Lacey (afterwards archdeacon emeritus)(1 April 1921 – 16 February 1997) ; wartime service RAFVR;  educated at King's College London; curacies, Crofton Park, Kingston upon Thames; incumbencies, Merton, Eltham
1989–1996 (res.): Gordon Kuhrt (afterwards archdeacon emeritus)
1996–2001 (res.): David Atkinson
September 2001–30 November 2012 (ret.): Christine Hardman (afterwards archdeacon emeritus)
In 2008, the archdeaconry was renamed Lewisham & Greenwich.
14 April 2013–present: Alastair Cutting

Archdeacons of Croydon

Archdeacons of Wandsworth
1973–1975 (ret.): Reginald Bazire
1975–1988 (res.): Peter Coombs
1989–2004 (ret.): David Gerrard (afterwards archdeacon emeritus)
2004–before September 2015: Stephen Roberts
22 July–22 November 2015 (Acting): Tim Marwood 
22 November 2015–present: John Kiddle

Archdeacons of Lambeth
1986–1988 (ret.): Charles Pinder (afterwards archdeacon emeritus)
1988–1999 (res.): Dick Bird
2000–2003 (res.): Nick Baines
2004–14 April 2013 (res.): Chris Skilton
2013–present: Simon Gates
20182 September 2018: David Stephenson (Acting)

References

 
 
 
 
 
 
 
Lists of Anglicans
Lists of English people